Fife Public Schools is a school district comprising parts of the Washington state cities of Fife, Milton, Edgewood, Tacoma, Pacific as well as unincorporated census-designated places Lakeland South and Fife Heights. The district was established on December 22, 1899.

Fife Schools is a member of the Standard Bearer Network founded by the Schlechty Center which is a non-profit organization that helps schools and districts to transform by emphasizing student engagement. Fife has been a member of the Standard Bearer Network since 2000.

Boundary
In Pierce County the district includes most of Fife, all of Fife Heights and the Pierce County portion of Milton, and portions of Edgewood and Tacoma.

In King County the district includes most of the King County portion of Milton, and portions of Lakeland South and Pacific.

Governance
The Board of Directors for Fife Public Schools is an elected body of five school directors. Each director must reside and be a registered voter, at the time of their election or appointment, in the geographical region, known as a Director District, they represent on the board. The length of the term is four years. Board meetings are generally held once a month. Currently, board meetings are typically scheduled for the last Monday of the month at 7:00 p.m., with some exceptions, in the boardroom at Fife School District's Office at 5802 20th St E, Fife, WA.

Schools
Discovery Primary School (K-1)
Endeavour Intermediate School (2-5)
Hedden Elementary School (2-5)
Surprise Lake Middle School (6-7)
Columbia Junior High (8-9)
Fife High School (10-12)

References

External links

History of the Fife School District
Fife High School Daffodil Festival History
Fife Superintendent

School districts in Washington (state)
Education in Pierce County, Washington
Education in King County, Washington
School districts established in 1899
1899 establishments in Washington (state)